Silvia Zenari (31 March 1895 – 30 June 1956) was an Italian geologist and botanist. Zenari was born in Udine, Italy and studied at the University of Padua, graduating in 1918.

While working for the Istituto di Geologia, Zenari studied the Dolomites in Belluno, Cadore, and Comelico between 1930 and 1950, eventually turning her focus on botany as well as geology.  She was the first to complete a study on the ecology of plant life at high elevations, primarily in the Sexten Dolomites range. She later moved on to studying the Schiara range, including Monte Serva. Her research included a statistical analysis of plants at various elevations, which explained the distribution of various species. In 1942 Zenari published a monograph entitled Contributo alla conoscenza della flora del Comelico (alto Cadore): note di critica sistematica, which described various groups of organisms in the Comelico region. Zenari's work on vegetation in the Dolomites was the last significant phytosociological research completed in the Dolomites for thirty years. Zenari later went on to become a Professor of Systemic Botany at University of Padua in Padova.

References

1895 births
1956 deaths
20th-century Italian women scientists
20th-century Italian geologists
20th-century Italian botanists
Italian women geologists
University of Padua alumni
Academic staff of the University of Padua
Women botanists